The 1911 Iowa State Cyclones football team represented Iowa State College of Agriculture and Mechanic Arts—now known as Iowa State University—as a member of the Missouri Valley Conference (MVC) during the 1911 college football season. Led by fifth-year head coach Clyde Williams, the Cyclones compiled an overall record of 6–1–1 with a mark of 2–0–1 in conference play, sharing the MVC title with Nebraska. Iowa State's only loss of the season came in their season-opener against Minnesota, who finished the season undefeated and won the Western Conference title.

Schedule

References

Iowa State
Iowa State Cyclones football seasons
Missouri Valley Conference football champion seasons
Iowa State Cyclones football